The Nevada State Museum in Carson City is one of seven Nevada State Museums operated by the Nevada Department of Tourism and Cultural Affairs. The primary building of the museum is the former Carson City Mint. The exhibits include:
 The world's largest exhibited Columbian Mammoth, found in the Black Rock Desert
 The silver service from the USS Nevada
The Nevada State Museum, Carson attracts various spectators in observing and appreciating the natural and cultural heritage of Nevada. It demonstrates the history from prehistoric period to modern day of the state including old geology, prehistoric animalian neighbors, days of silver mining and American Indian culture.

History 
Nevada State Museum, Carson City came into force by conserving the Carson City mint. The mint was in operation from 1870 to 1893 but it houses the earliest coin press which operates from here until date. Coin Press No. 1 which is the sole coin press generates medallions with the famed CC mint mark even now. The museum was opened in 1941; very few museums in Nevada are as loved as this one to the present day. It houses some rare collections related to history of the American West: Basketry of the Great Basin Native American people, Fey Slot Machine Collection, guns of the Old West, Chinatown cultural materials, and the splendid silver service set made for the USS Nevada battleship.

Exhibits at the Nevada State Museum 
 Historic Carson City Mint: Coin Press No. 1 of the Mint and the CC (Carson City) marked Comstock silver dollars.
 Nevada's Changing Earth 
 Nevada: A People and Place through Time: it offers a march through the history of Nevada. The USS Nevada Battleship is the main attraction of this exhibit which is silver service fashioned from 5,000 ounces of silver and lined with gold from Goldfield.
 Under One Sky: it demonstrates the history of the earliest inhabitants through artifacts of Nevada which are 10,000 years old. Situated in the latest section of the museum, this exhibit shows American Indian culture from Native American viewpoint.

See also 

 Nevada State Museum, Las Vegas

References

External links

Museums in Carson City, Nevada
History museums in Nevada
Natural history museums in Nevada
Paleontology in Nevada